Bundelkhand Institute of Engineering and Technology, Jhansi  (commonly known as BIET Jhansi) is an autonomous engineering college in Jhansi, Uttar Pradesh, India. It is an affiliated college of Dr. A.P.J. Abdul Kalam Technical University (AKTU). It is recognised by the All India Council for Technical Education.

It was established in 1986 by the Government of Uttar Pradesh to provide impetus to technical education in the state and was the fifth government engineering college in the state. The first batch of the college was admitted in 1989 and graduated in 1993.

The highest executive body of the institute is the Board of Governors. 
Prof. Pulak M Pandey is currently officiating as the Director of the institute.

Management and administration 
BIET Jhansi is funded by the government of Uttar Pradesh. However, many of the new projects are also being supported by the World Bank under the Technical Education Quality Improvement Project (TEQIP).

Bundelkhand Institute of Engineering and Technology is a registered society under the Society Registration Act 1860, at Jhansi. The Board of Governors is the governing body of the society.

History 
The foundation stone of the institute was laid in May 1986 by the then Chief Minister of Uttar Pradesh, Vir Bahadur Singh. The first director of the institute was Prof. Ram Singh Nirjar, who became the chairman of the All India Council of Technical Education. He assumed office as the first director of the institute (then known as "Bundelkhand Engineering College") in 1988.

45 and 60 students respectively and Electronics and Instrumentation Engineering were rechristened as Electronics and Communication Engineering and intake was raised to 60. In 2002, the intake of Civil Engineering was increased to 45. From 2002 a four-year BTech programme in Electrical Engineering with an intake of 60 students was added to the existing BTech programmes.

In 2005 two postgraduate programmes in Environmental Engineering and Construction Technology and Management (in the Civil Engineering Department) and one in Manufacturing Science and Technology (in the Mechanical Engineering Department) with the intake of 18 students each were started. In 2006 an MTech programme in Digital Communication System (in the Electronics and Communication Engineering Department) with an intake of 20 students was added to the list of postgraduate programmes. In 2007, a two-year management programme leading to an M.B.A. degree with an intake of 60 students, was started. The total intake of students in the institute, including MTech programmes, is 474.

Admissions 
The institute admits students for its Bachelor in Technology (BTech) programme from all over India through the competitive JEE Mains.

Accreditation 
The Bachelor of Technology courses in Civil, Electronics and Communication, Mechanical, Computer Science and Chemical branches of the institute are accredited by the National Board of Accreditation.

Affiliation 
The institute became autonomous in 2011-2012 session for B.Tech. branches but is affiliated to Dr. A.P.J. Abdul Kalam Technical University, Lucknow.

Location 
BIET is in the historical city of Jhansi in the Bundelkhand region of the state of Uttar Pradesh in north India. The institute's campus is around 12 kilometres from the Jhansi Central Railway Station, on the Jhansi-Kanpur National Highway (NH 25).

Departments

Chemical engineering 
The Department of Chemical Engineering was established in 1996. The department has organized training programs under World Bank Assisted, Technical Education Quality Improvement Program (TEQIP).

The department has Chemical Engineering lab, Fluid Mechanics Lab, Fluid and Particle Operations Lab, Heat Transfer Lab, Chemical Reaction Engineering Lab, Process Dynamics and Instrumentation Lab, Chemical Technology Lab, Energy Lab and Mass Transfer Lab. The department has a CAD lab with Chemical Engineering software like Aspen, Origin, and Pro simulator.

Civil engineering 
The Department of Civil Engineering was established in 1989. The department is engaged by the Ministry of Urban Development, Government of India, Rural Engineering Services and U.P. Jal Nigam to train field and sector professionals for government departments. The department does research projects sponsored by AICTE/DST/UP-CST.

Computer science and engineering 
The Department of Computer Science and Engineering was established in 1989. The department is a member of the Computer Society of India (CSI). The department has a Software Development Lab, Information System Lab, Computer Graphics Lab, UNIX and LINUX Lab, and a Database Management Lab. The unique feature of the college is SUN Java Lab, which is not available in any other college of UPTU. The department gives internet service to students through the ISDN line provided by BSNL. These computers are connected through LAN and these are supported by a SUN server with EM 64T (extended Memory 64-bit Technology Intel Xeon processor) with 800 or higher MHz front-side bus and hyperthreading support.

The systems are equipped with operating systems such as LINUX, UNIX, Solaris, Windows NT, Windows XP and software packages that include Java, Oracle 10i, Developer 2000, C++/C, Visual Basic, ASP, SQL Server etc. and open-source software packages.

Electronics and communication engineering 
The Department of Electronics and Communication Engineering was established in 1998. The department has a Microprocessor Lab. The Digital Electronics Lab is used for the study of encoders and decoders, multiplexers and de multi, flip -flops, counters and shift registers, and parity generators and checkers. A brief idea of digital I.C. is also provided.

A Fiber Optics Communication Lab is established in the department, provides education on fibre optics communication, analogue and digital link, attenuation: banding, and impurities. Other labs include Printed Circuit Board Lab and Electrical Machine Lab.

The department contributes to IEEE by doing research.

Information technology 
The Department of Information Technology was established in 2000. It hosts Digital and Computer Graphics Lab which consist of 15 Logic Trainer Boards, performing logical testing facilities. The department is equipped with 64 bit RISC Based IDNY (R400) silicon graphic server. The Department has Image Processing tools, Meta Labs, and other graphic facilities.

Mechanical engineering 
The Department of Mechanical Engineering was established in 1990. The department has a CAD Lab equipped with Pentium IV 2.8  GHz, plotters etc. and software packages such as Pro-e (WildFire), Catia, Autocad 2000. The department has a Refrigeration and Air-Conditioning Lab, Fluid Machinery Lab, Machine Lab, Heat Transfer Lab, Automobile Lab and Materials testing lab.

Electrical engineering 
The department has an electrical engineering lab. The department has various renowned staff. The Electrical Engineering Branch and IT branch of this institution are Self financing Branch, i.e. student have to pay extra Rs. 15,000 in each semester compared to other branches if one takes admission in this branch.

Infrastructure

Campus
The campus is divided into four zones:

 Student Residential Zone
 Faculty and Staff Residential Zone
 Student Recreational Area that includes the Student Activity Center (SAC), forums and their offices, cricket ground, basketball courts and hockey field
 Academic Zone that includes academic institute building, engineering departments, offices, lecture halls, central library and workshops

IBM Centre of Excellence
IBM identified BIET Jhansi as an IBM Centre of Excellence, starting academic session 2010–11. Through the IBM Academic Initiative, IBM is working with BIET Jhansi to teach students the open-standards skills to compete in the ever-changing technology workplace by conducting training for students through faculty enabled by IBM.

Faculty

The teacher-student ratio stands at 1:20. Faculty with postgraduate qualification stands at 100% whereas the percentage of faculty with PhD is 68%.

The institute employs senior technical personnel as guest faculty following the trend of industry-academia collaboration. The institute encourages industrial trips to, and closer co-operation with, government and private industry.

Life at BIET

Council of Student Activities 

There is a council known as 'Council of Student Activities' which is the sole backbone for majorly every activity held for the students of the college.
It is also responsible for managing the number of events, fests and other functions being organised using CSA name.

CSA has a President which is the top-position given to a senior professor of the institute, he/she presides over all meetings and events held on the terms of student activities.
Prof. D.K. Srivastava is currently the president, Council of Student Activities.

Each sub-councils has a nominated Officer-In-Charge from among the faculty members who are the head of the sub-councils, and he/she holds the office for that particular sub-council. They play a major role in organising the events/functions under their guidance, support and supervision.

Further, every sub-councils has a number of students actively taking the legacy forward.

In BIET, the CSA is officially divided into 4 sub-councils based on the concerned activities & functionary roles each of them has to play for the current students present on campus.

Sub-Councils 

Cultural Sub Council (popularly known as CSC): CSC plays a crucial role in providing the perfect platform for rich & passionate cultural activities which enables students to come forward and showcase their hidden talents. It aims at nurturing the skills and upbringing of the co-curricular artists in the college. The organizing and management team is responsible for the proper and smooth functioning of the festivals and events.

'Abhinandan'- the Freshers' Party & 'Utsav' - the Annual Cultural Fest, and various other cultural events in the college, all are organized under the banner of Cultural Sub Council.
Dr. Narendra Kumar is the current officer-in-charge, CSC.

Fine Arts & Hobbies Sub Council (popularly known as FAH): FAH conducts various activities related to fine arts and hobbies such as sketching, dexterity, collage, face-painting, movie-making, photography and many others which comes in categories like these. It has the privilege of organizing 5–7 days MAHOTSAV (annual art festival) which is one of the biggest art festivals in the region.

FAH had set the new benchmark by organizing its own annual kite-flying festival (KATI PATANG) for the first time in the state, and since then every year it's held on 26 January. 
Dr. R.N. Verma is the current officer-in-charge, FAH.

Events

Annual Cultural Festival - UTSAV
Utsav provides an opportunity for the budding talent in the institute to showcase their talent to a larger audience.
These include diverse performances like Singing, Dancing, Compering, Skits, Theme Dance, Panache, Mime, etc.
The organizing and management team is responsible for the proper and smooth functioning of the festivals and events.

Annual Technical Festival - TechZion
TechZion is our annual technical festival which allows students to showcase their technical abilities beyond the ambit of academics. Many colleges of repute are invited to take part in TeChZioN. Technical symposiums and guest speakers from many areas of technical research and development mark this event. Innovative ideas are transformed into real technical artefacts as the students explore beyond the ambit of pure academics and try their hand at less known technologies.

Annual Sports Festival - PACE
Pace is our annual sports fest which promotes a spirit of friendly competition among all the branches of the college. The overall winner branch parades through the institute central playground.

Bencolites

The institute was used to be known as Bundelkhand Engineering College.  BENCOL is an acronym for Bundelkhand ENgineering COLlege. Hence the term "Bencolites" refers to the students (current and graduated) of the institute. Though BENCOL was changed to BIET (in around 1994–1995), the term Bencolites is still used by alumni and current student in the proper and popular legacy culture.

References

External links
 Official website

Engineering colleges in Uttar Pradesh
All India Council for Technical Education
Education in Jhansi
Educational institutions established in 1986
1986 establishments in Uttar Pradesh
Dr. A.P.J. Abdul Kalam Technical University